Jim Zeigler (born May 23, 1948) is an American lawyer and politician who served as state auditor of Alabama from 2015 to 2023. Before becoming state auditor, he served on the Alabama Public Service Commission from 1974 to 1978.

Early life and education
While a student at the University of Alabama, Zeigler served as the president of the Student Government Association (SGA). Zeigler lived at Mallet Hall from 1966 to 1970, and served as SGA president from 1970-71. He was one of the few to be elected to the post in opposition to "The Machine," a semi-secret alignment of fraternities and sororities that historically dominated the university's student government. He graduated from the university in 1972. In 1978, he graduated from the Faulkner University Jones School of Law.

Early political career
Zeigler won a position on the Alabama Public Service Commission in 1974, at the age of 24. He did not run for reelection in 1978.

Zeigler ran for state office unsuccessfully seven times, four as a Democrat, and three as a Republican, losing elections for President of the Public Service Commission in 1976, the Alabama Board of Education in 1978, Supreme Court of Alabama in 1982, State Treasurer of Alabama in 1986, the Alabama Court of Civil Appeals in 1996, Public Service Commission in 1998, and State Auditor of Alabama in 2002. These close losses earned him the nickname "Mr. 49 Percent". In 2006, Zeigler announced the end of his political activism, as he resigned from the Conservative Christians of Alabama and the League of Christian Voters, two political action committees for which he served as chairman.

State auditor
Zeigler ran for state auditor in 2014. In the Republican primary, Zeigler faced Dale Peterson, candidate for Agriculture Commissioner in 2010; Adam Thompson, Deputy Chief of Staff in the Alabama Secretary of State's office; and Hobbie Sealy, former Deputy Conservation Commissioner. Zeigler won a runoff against Peterson, and defeated Miranda Joseph, the Democratic Party nominee, in the general election. In 2015, Zeigler filed lawsuits against Luther Strange, the Attorney General of Alabama, and Baldwin County, Alabama schools to stop them from spending taxpayer money on political campaigns. The suits were dismissed.

Following the Charleston church shooting in June 2015, Zeigler advocated that parishioners take their guns to church. Zeigler gave a speech to the League of the South, termed a hate group by the Southern Poverty Law Center, in September 2015. 

In March 2016, Zeigler filed an ethics complaint against Robert J. Bentley, the Governor of Alabama, for allegedly using state funds in an extramarital affair.  A year later the Ethics Commission found "probable cause" against Bentley. And three days later, Bentley resigned.

On March 2, 2017, Zeigler became embroiled in nationwide controversy and condemnation when he posted a picture on Twitter comparing Congresswomen dressed in white to the Ku Klux Klan. Zeigler defended his post, saying that when the Congresswomen wore white as a symbol of Women's Suffrage at a speech by President Trump, "when they did that, they opened themselves up to criticisms and questions about that."

In November 2017, following the allegations of child molestation made against Republican Roy Moore, Zeigler was quoted as saying: "Even if you accept the Washington Post's report as being completely true, it's much ado about very little." Zeigler argued that relationships between grown men and teenage girls were acceptable because "take Joseph and Mary. Mary was a teenager and Joseph was an adult carpenter. They became parents of Jesus." Multiple Biblical scholars disputed his defense, noting that the exact ages of Joseph and Mary at the time they were betrothed or married remain uncertain, as they are not included in the Bible. In addition, Jesuit priest Jim Martin tweeted that "...comparing the allegations against Roy Moore in any way to Joseph and Mary is disgusting."

In January 2019, Zeigler came under fire for comments aimed at U.S. Senator Kyrsten Sinema, calling her choice of clothing while on the Senate floor "improperly attired."

In 2019, Zeigler led a successful grassroots movement to block a proposed toll bridge on Interstate 10 across the Mobile Bay.

In the March 3, 2020, Alabama Republican presidential primary, Jim Zeigler lost to Governor Kay Ivey for the Place 1 Delegate at the Republican National Convention.  

In February 2020, Jim Zeigler and his wife Jackie successfully teamed up to fight the proposed Amendment One which would have replaced the elected school board, which his wife is a member of, with one appointed by the governor. Amendment One was soundly defeated in the March 2020 primary.

Zeigler was considered a possible candidate for the 2022 Alabama gubernatorial election; he informally campaigned for the position, filed paperwork to run, and formed an exploratory committee, but never officially announced a run. Zeigler announced on January 23, 2022, that he ultimately would not run for governor, citing a lack of funds compared to the leading candidates, including incumbent Governor Kay Ivey, Lynda Blanchard, and Tim James. Three days later, Zeigler announced that he would run for Secretary of State of Alabama in the 2022 election instead, claiming that "national attempts to manipulate honest election procedures" were a major threat. Zeigler won the first round of voting on May 24, 2022, but did not pass the threshold to avoid a runoff. State representative Wes Allen rebounded in the runoff on June 21, defeating Zeigler for the nomination.

Zeigler was term-limited as State Auditor and could not seek re-election in 2022, and was succeeded by Andrew Sorrell.

Personal life
Zeigler is married to Jackie Zeigler, a member of the Alabama State Board of Education, and has two children.

Electoral history

References

External links

|-

1948 births
21st-century American politicians
Alabama Democrats
Alabama Republicans
Living people
People from Sylacauga, Alabama
State Auditors of Alabama
University of Alabama alumni